Shalf is a sub-district located in Al Udayn District, Ibb Governorate, Yemen. Shalf had a population of 3681 as of 2004.

References 

Sub-districts in Al Udayn District